Anthony David Blankley (January 21, 1948 – January 7, 2012) was an American political analyst who gained fame as the press secretary for Newt Gingrich, the first Republican Speaker of the House in forty years, and as a regular panelist on The McLaughlin Group. He later became an Executive Vice President with Edelman public relations in Washington, D.C. He was a Visiting Senior Fellow in National-Security Communications at the Heritage Foundation, a weekly contributor to the nationally syndicated public radio programme Left, Right & Center, the author of The West's Last Chance: Will We Win the Clash of Civilizations? and American Grit: What It Will Take to Survive and Win in the 21st Century. He served as the editorial page editor for The Washington Times from 2002–2009.

Early life
Blankley was briefly a child actor appearing, most notably, as Rod Steiger's son in The Harder They Fall (1956). The movie was, as Blankley liked to joke, both his and his co-star Humphrey Bogart's last movie. He graduated from UCLA and Loyola Law School (Los Angeles), earning a J.D. He was admitted to the State Bar of California in 1972.

Career
Prior to his career on Capitol Hill, Blankley served President Ronald Reagan as a policy analyst and speechwriter, and was a staff writer for Congresswoman Bobbi Fiedler.

Before coming to Washington, D.C., he spent 10 years as a Deputy Attorney General with the California Attorney General's office.

His political opinions were generally considered to fall within traditional conservatism although he was labeled as a neoconservative by some critics. He denied that label, claiming that his views are more comparable to a classic conservative such as Reagan. His political career spanned several decades, and his most prominent position was a seven-year stint as House Speaker Newt Gingrich's press secretary.

He was a regular commentator for radio shows including The Diane Rehm Show, Left, Right & Center and The Steve Gill Show with a segment titled Fill In the Blanks.

His 2006 book The West's Last Chance described how "Within our lifetimes, Europe could become Eurabia, a continent overwhelmed by militant Islam, which poses a greater threat to the United States than Nazi Germany did."

Earlier in his career, Blankley was an editorial page editor for The Washington Times, a contributing editor and monthly columnist for George Magazine, and a regular panelist on The McLaughlin Group. He continued to write for The Washington Times. He lectured at many universities and institutes. On November 19, 2009, he presented his lecture, A Year out from the 2010 Congressional Elections – National Politics, Policy and their Communication, at the New Hampshire Institute of Politics of Saint Anselm College.

Death
Blankley died in Washington, D.C., of stomach cancer on January 7, 2012, at Sibley Memorial Hospital, two weeks before his 64th birthday.

References

External links

 Archives: Tony Blankley, townhall.com
 Tony Blankley blog, HuffingtonPost.com 
 Podcasts of Blankley's recent articles, outloudopinion.com
 Left Right & Center, kcrw.com
 
  
 

1948 births
2012 deaths
Alumni of the University of London
American columnists
American male child actors
American male non-fiction writers
American political writers
American prosecutors
California Republicans
Deaths from cancer in Washington, D.C.
Deaths from stomach cancer
English emigrants to the United States
Fairfax High School (Los Angeles) alumni
The Heritage Foundation
HuffPost writers and columnists
Loyola Law School alumni
Newt Gingrich
People from Los Angeles
Reagan administration personnel
University of California, Los Angeles alumni
Virginia Republicans
The Washington Times people
People from Great Falls, Virginia